Cardiff Central station may refer to:

Cardiff Central bus station
Cardiff Central railway station